Angela Stevens (born Ann Evelyn Allen, May 8, 1925 – March 17, 2016) was an American film actress and singer.

Biography
Stevens was born in Eagle Rock, California. She appeared in several Three Stooges films, such as He Cooked His Goose, Pardon My Backfire and Blunder Boys. Other credits include The Hoodlum, Without Warning!, Creature with the Atom Brain, The Harder They Fall and The Wild One.

In 1955, Stevens sued a dress shop owner for $36,500, saying that an attack from a "wild and vicious" ocelot disfigured her, which cost her a role in a film.

Stevens married George Zika in the early 1940s

Filmography

Feature films
Utah Blaine (1957) as Mary Blake
The Shadow on the Window (1957) as Myra
The Harder They Fall (1956) as Girl
Blackjack Ketchum, Desperado (1956) as Laurie Webster
The Naked Street (1955) as Janet
Women's Prison (1955) as Prisoner
Creature with the Atom Brain (1955) as Joyce Walker
Devil Goddess (1955) as Nora Blakely
The Wild One (1954) as Betty
The Last Time I Saw Paris (1954) as Pert young girl
Savage Mutiny (1953) as Joan Harris
Jack McCall, Desperado (1953) as Rose Griffith
From Here to Eternity (1953) as Jean
The Mississippi Gambler (1953) as Girl
Without Warning! (1952) as Blonde
Eight Iron Men (1952)
The Kid from Broken Gun (1952) as Gail Kingston
Outlaw Women (1952)
Just This Once (1952) as Girl
In Old Amarillo (1951) as Bar girl
Two Tickets to Broadway (1951) as Blonde
The Hoodlum (1951) as Christie Lang
Iron Man (1951) as Girl
Katie Did It (1951) as Taffy

References

External links

Angela Stevens at threestooges.net
Interview with Angela Stevens October 5, 2007

1925 births
2016 deaths
American film actresses
American television actresses
Actresses from Los Angeles
Singers from Los Angeles
21st-century American women